William Dempster Hoard (October 10, 1836November 22, 1918) was an American politician, newspaper publisher, and agriculture advocate who served as the 16th governor of Wisconsin from 1889 to 1891.

Hoard is called the "father of modern dairying"; his advocacy for scientific agriculture and the expansion of dairy farming has been credited with changing Wisconsin's agricultural economy. Hoard's promotion of the use of silos and alfalfa for cattle feed, testing for bovine tuberculosis, and single-use cattle herds in his magazine Hoard's Dairyman led to those practices becoming commonplace throughout the United States. His work with the Wisconsin Dairymen's Association led to the exporting of Wisconsin dairy products to the East Coast and national renown for them.

As editor of his newspaper the Jefferson County Union, Hoard was one the first county news editors to expand his coverage through the use of local correspondents and to include a strongly voiced editorial page in a small newspaper, which he used to advocate for improved farming practices and dairy farming.

As Governor of Wisconsin, Hoard established the Dairy and Food Commission—one of the first food inspection agencies in the United States—and passed a controversial, short-lived compulsory education law that required all students in the state be taught in English as part of the Americanization process for German and Scandinavian immigrants.

Early life and education
William D. Hoard was born on October 10, 1836, in Munnsville, New York, to William Bradford Hoard and Sarah Katherine White Hoard. He was the eldest of four children. His father was a blacksmith and itinerant Methodist minister who preached to Oneida people. Hoard was educated in a log schoolhouse that was built by his grandfather Enos, who also maintained a library. The library and encouragement from Hoard's mother led to a passion for reading. At age 16, Hoard left school to work as a farmhand for Waterman Simons, a neighboring dairy farmer from whom Hoard learned how to make cheese and butter. While working as a farmhand, Hoard witnessed the depletion of New York soil by the growing of wheat and other crops that led to the adoption of dairy farming in the state.

In 1857, Hoard moved to Oak Grove, Wisconsin, where he studied to become a Methodist minister until conflict with church leadership led him to abandon that path. For the next three years, Hoard found employment chopping wood and giving singing lessons. In 1860, he married Agnes Elizabeth Bragg and moved in with her parents in Lake Mills, Wisconsin.

After the outbreak of the American Civil War, Hoard—an admirer of Abraham Lincoln—enlisted in the Union Army. He was assigned to the 4th Wisconsin Infantry Regiment as a fife player and participated in the Capture of New Orleans. Hoard became ill while pursuing Confederate soldiers and was discharged. Hoard returned to his parents' farm in New York; after fully recovering, he re-enlisted in the Union Army and was assigned to Battery A of the 1st New York Light Artillery Battalion, serving until the end of the war in 1865.

Career

Publishing and advocacy

Jefferson County Union and Hoard Dairyman
After the war, Hoard moved to Columbus, Wisconsin, and attempted to grow hops. The price of the crop collapsed and Hoard gave up hop farming.

In 1870, William D. Hoard founded a weekly newspaper named the Jefferson County Union in Lake Mills. Against trends of the time, Hoard expanded his paper's coverage to include surrounding areas. According to biographer George William Rankin,  Hoard's use of local correspondents to expand his newspaper's reach was among the first by a county newspaper in the United States. Early editions of the Jefferson County Union were printed under contract with Watertown Republican, for which Hoard had written prior to founding his own newspaper. Hoard moved the Jefferson County Union to Fort Atkinson, Wisconsin, in 1873 and by 1883, he had constructed a new building that included a printing press.

Hoard also worked as editor of the Jefferson County Union; he included an editorial page in the paper, another rarity for small newspapers of the time. He used editorial columns to write about a variety of topics, most prominently the promotion of scientific agricultural practices. Readers received these editorials with skepticism due to Hoard's lack of experience in Wisconsin agriculture, and referred to him as a theorist and a "book farmer". Hoard continued to write agriculture columns and after encouragement from his son Arthur and Ed E. Coe, publisher of the Whitewater Register, founded Hoard's Dairyman in 1885 as a folio supplement to the Jefferson County Union.

Hoard's Dairyman was initially financially supported by its parent newspaper but by 1889, it had become a separate publication that focused primarily on dairy farming. As was commonplace with dairy trade publications at the time, Hoard mixed reporting and advertising in Hoard's Dairyman, juxtaposing advertising with articles promoting the advertised technique or technology.

In Hoard's Dairyman, Hoard advocated for agricultural practices that became commonplace in Wisconsin and beyond, including regular testing of herds for bovine tuberculosis, the growth and use of alfalfa as cattle feed, the use of particular breeds of cattle for milking or meat, the use of the Babcock test to test the butterfat content of milk, and the adoption of silos to store cattle feed. By 1924, Hoard's Dairyman had readers in Japan, Australia, and England. It is considered the first agriculture publication to have a nationwide readership in the United States.

Trade associations and lobbying

William D. Hoard founded the Jefferson County Dairymen's Association in 1871. Realizing the county-level group was too small to effectively advocate for dairying on a large scale, the following year, Hoard founded the Wisconsin Dairymen's Association with Chester Hazen, Walter S. Greene, Stephen and A.D. Favill, H.C. Drake, and H.F. Dousman to improve and promote Wisconsin's dairy products. The following year, Hoard traveled to Chicago to barter with rail lines to secure better prices and refrigerated railcars for the transport of cheese from Wisconsin to the U.S. East Coast. Hoard's efforts were a success; Star Union Line took a refrigerated car to Watertown to transport cheese out of the state.

Through the Wisconsin Dairymen's Association, Hoard and other founders successfully lobbied for the passage of agriculture-related laws and regulations, including legislation to ban filled cheese, and the establishment of farmers institutes and the College of Agriculture at the University of Wisconsin. At the University, the group campaigned for the establishment of the first dairy school in the U.S., which taught the making of butter and cheese. The group also campaigned for the showing of Wisconsin dairy products in Philadelphia and Chicago, increasing the reputation of Wisconsin dairy products. Hoard also helped found the Northwest Dairymen's Association and the Farmers National Congress.

Hoard opposed the sale of adulterated dairy products, and advocated against the sale of oleomargarine, which became popular in the late 1800s. Oleomargarine, which is made by emulsifying lard with milk and water, was often dyed yellow to give it the appearance of butter and was sold as such. The cost of producing oleomargarine was much lower than that of producing butter, and dairy farmers viewed it as a threat to their livelihoods. In 1894, Hoard founded the National Dairy Union and campaigned for an additional tax to be placed on the sale of dyed oleomargarine, which he viewed as a fraudulent product. Hoard often testified before Congress about the fraudulent nature of oleomargarine between 1898 and 1902, and helped secure the passage of the Oleomargarine Act of 1902, which added an additional 10-cent tax on the sale of colored oleomargarine and briefly caused a decline in its production.

Political career

Early career
Hoard was educated in politics as a child; in 1870, he  was appointed as a deputy U.S. Marshal, and was assigned to be a census taker in Lake Mills and the surrounding area. While taking the census, Hoard met a family of German immigrants who could not speak English and had been tricked out of a large sum of money by English-speaking confidence tricksters. The experience influenced Hoard's opinions on education when he became governor. In 1872, Hoard was named the sergeant-at-arms for the Wisconsin Senate.

16th Governor of Wisconsin
By 1888, William D. Hoard had become a popular speaker, lecturing on agricultural topics throughout the state. He was nominated as the Republican candidate for governor in an anonymous article in Milwaukee Sentinel that year and received strong support from farmers throughout the state. He was elected as the 16th Governor of Wisconsin in the 1888 Wisconsin gubernatorial election, defeating Democratic candidate James Morgan. Hoard served a single, two-year term as governor. His administration saw the creation of the first food inspection agency in the United States and the passage of a controversial compulsory education law that mandated schools to educate their pupils in English.

As Governor, Hoard established the Dairy and Food Commission to oversee dairy production in the state and to enforce bans on skimmed cheese, a type of cheese that quickly spoils due to its reduced butterfat content, and other adulterated dairy products. The Commission was the first government agency in the U.S. to regulate food quality.

Bennett Law

The first legislation Hoard signed was the Bennett Law, which was passed in April 1889 and mandated children in the state aged 7-to-14 to attend school in their district of residence for at least 12 weeks per year, and to receive instruction in English. The latter provision was added by Hoard, who advocated for the Americanization of immigrants in the state and viewed English literacy as an important step in the process.

By 1890, approximately 70% of the Wisconsin population was immigrants or had at least one immigrant parent; many of that group had German ancestry. German Lutherans and German Catholics in Wisconsin, who retained strong ethnic pride for Germany, felt the law targeted their parochial schools, many of which primarily taught their courses in German. Hoard felt churches focused more on growing their congregations in these schools than on fostering American citizenship.

In March 1890, the three Catholic bishops of Wisconsin published a manifesto opposing the law and three months later, the Wisconsin, Missouri, and Evangelical synods denounced it. German-language publications throughout the state advocated for the law's repeal, and called for Catholics and Lutherans to campaign for the law's repeal after the election of 1890. The Bennett Law became the primary issue of the contest, though economic pressures attributed to the McKinley Tariff also played a significant role. Hoard defended the law but Republican-supporting German voters turned against the party in 1890. Democrats won a supermajority in the Wisconsin Legislature—eight of nine available seats in the U.S. House of Representatives—and Hoard was defeated by George Wilbur Peck for the governorship. The Bennett Law was repealed in February 1891, the first act of the new legislature. Historian Louise Phelps Kellogg noted the law's purpose of increasing English literacy in immigrant communities was still achieved; parochial schools sought to prove the legislation was not needed by introducing more English-language instruction in their classrooms.

Legacy

William D. Hoard is often credited with changing the agricultural economy of Wisconsin from the growth of wheat to the raising of dairy cattle and production of dairy products. Los Angeles Times called Hoard "the father of modern dairying". His advocacy for agricultural practices such as single-use herds for dairying, and the use of silage and alfalfa as cattle feed led to those practices becoming commonplace throughout the United States. He was named Wisconsin's "Most Distinguished Citizen" in 1915.

In 1907, Hoard was added to the University of Wisconsin's Board of Regents and helped transport a dairy herd to the campus in Madison and to arrange the construction of the Livestock Pavilion. Hoard was honored with a statue by Gutzon Borglum, which was placed on Henry Mall in front of the College of Agriculture at  the University of Wisconsin campus in 1922.

The Hoard's Dairyman Farm is listed on the National Register of Historic Places and is considered the most-famous dairy farm in the world.

Personal life
William D. Hoard married Agnes Elizabeth Bragg in 1860. The couple had three children; Halbert Louis, Arthur Ralph, and Frank Ward. Hoard died on November 22, 1918, and was buried in Fort Atkinson.

Notes

See also
Hoard Historical Museum

References

Further reading

External links

Republican Party governors of Wisconsin
People from Stockbridge, New York
People from Fort Atkinson, Wisconsin
People of New York (state) in the American Civil War
People of Wisconsin in the American Civil War
Union Army soldiers
American magazine editors
American agriculturalists
1836 births
1918 deaths
19th-century American politicians
Burials in Wisconsin
Dairy farmers